The Four Minute Mile is a television mini series about the race to run the four-minute mile, focusing on the rivalry between Roger Bannister and John Landy.

References

External links
The Four Minute Mile at IMDb

Middle-distance running
1980s Australian television miniseries
1988 Australian television series debuts
1988 Australian television series endings
1988 television films
1988 films
Films directed by Jim Goddard
Athletics films
Running films
Biographical films about sportspeople
Cultural depictions of British men
Cultural depictions of track and field athletes